Events from the year 1550 in Sweden

Incumbents
 King – Gustav I

Events

 12 June - Foundation of Helsingfors, now the Helsinki, the capital of Finland. 
 - The witch trial against Lasses Birgitta, referred to as the first execution for witch craft in Sweden.

Births

 4 October - Charles IX of Sweden, king (1604-1611) of Sweden (died 1611).
 6 November - Karin Månsdotter royal mistress and queen  (died 1612).
 Date unknown - Nicolaus Olai Bothniensis, archbishop  (died 1600).

Deaths

 Unknown date - Lasses Birgitta, alleged witch

References

External links

 
Years of the 16th century in Sweden
Sweden